The Hillary Montes  or  (less officially, Hillary Mountains) are mountains that reach  above the surface of the dwarf planet Pluto. They are located northwest of Tenzing Montes in the southwest border area of Sputnik Planitia in the south of Tombaugh Regio (or the part of Tombaugh Regio south of the equator). The Hillary Montes were first viewed by the New Horizons spacecraft on 14 July 2015, and announced by NASA on 24 July 2015.

Naming
The mountains are named after Sir Edmund Hillary, New Zealand mountaineer, who, along with Nepalese Sherpa mountaineer, Tenzing Norgay, were the first climbers to reach the summit of the highest peak on Earth, Mount Everest, on 29 May 1953. On 7 September 2017, the name Hillary Montes was officially approved together with the names of Tombaugh Regio and twelve other nearby surface features.

Relative size
The Hillary Montes are similar in height to that of the peak of Mount Fuji, the highest mountain in Japan, above sea level.

Gallery

Videos

See also

 Geography of Pluto
 Geology of Pluto
 List of geological features on Pluto
 List of tallest mountains in the Solar System

Notes

References

External links
 NASA Pluto factsheet
 NASA Official homepage
 New Horizons homepage

Extraterrestrial mountains
Surface features of Pluto
Edmund Hillary
Geography of Pluto
Articles containing video clips